Below is a list of chief commissioners of Baluchistan:

Chief commissioners of Baluchistan
1877–1887: Sir Oliver St John (acting)
1887–1889: Sir Robert Sandeman
1889: Sir Harry Prendergast (acting)
1889–1891: Sir Robert Sandeman
1891: Hugh Barnes
1891: Sir Oliver St John
1891: Hugh Barnes (acting)
1891: John Biddulph (acting)
1891–1892: Sir Robert Sandeman
1892: Hugh Barnes (acting)
1892–1896: Sir James Browne
1896: James Adair Crawford (acting)
1896–1899: Hugh Barnes
1899: Henry Wylie (acting)
1899–1900: Hugh Barnes
1900–1904: Charles Yate
1904–1905: John Ramsay (acting)
1905–1907: Alexander Tucker (acting)
1907–1909: Sir Henry McMahon
1909: Charles Archer (acting)
1909–1911: Sir Henry McMahon
1911–1912: John Ramsay
1912: Charles Archer (acting)
1912–1914: John Ramsay
1914: Charles Archer (acting)
1914–1915: John Ramsay
1915: Charles Archer (acting)
1915–1917: John Ramsay
1917–1919: Henry Dobbs
1919–1922: Armine Dew
1922–1923: Henry St John (acting)
1923–1926: Frederick Johnston
1926–1927: Edmond James (acting)
1927–1929: Henry St John
1929: Edmond James (acting)
1929–1931: Charles Bruce (acting)
1931–1932: Norman Cater (acting)
1932: John Brett (acting)
1932–1936: Norman Cater
1936: Ronald Wingate (acting)
1936–1937: Arthur Parsons (acting)
1937: Ronald Wingate (acting)
1937–1938: Olaf Caroe (acting)
1938–1939: Arthur Parsons
1939–1943: Sir Herbert Metcalfe
1943–1946: Rupert Hay
1946: Henry Poulton
1946–1947: Sir Geoffrey Prior